The Exhall mid-air collision happened on Saturday 19 February 1949 over the village of Exhall when a British European Airways Douglas DC-3 / Douglas Dakota collided in clear weather with a Royal Air Force Avro Anson T21.

The Dakota was on a flight from Northolt Airport near London to Glasgow-Renfrew Airport in Scotland. With a crew of four it was carrying six passengers, and had taken off from Northolt at 09:13 hr. The Royal Air Force Avro Anson T21 was being operated by No. 2 Air Navigation School on a cross-country training exercise from RAF Middleton St. George.

The two aircraft collided at 4500 ft near the village of Exhall, near Coventry in Warwickshire.  The wreckage fell near an old peoples' home, the Exhall Lodge Hospital. There were no survivors.

Although the weather at the time of the crash was clear, the accident investigation concluded that the crew of neither aircraft saw each other, possibly due to glare from the sun, and blamed the accident on a failure on the part of both captains to keep a proper look-out for other aircraft.

References

Aviation accidents and incidents in England
Aviation accidents and incidents in 1949
Accidents and incidents involving Royal Air Force aircraft
Mid-air collisions
Mid-air collisions involving airliners
Mid-air collisions involving military aircraft
Accidents and incidents involving the Douglas C-47 Skytrain
Accidents and incidents involving the Avro Anson
19490219
1949 in England
1949 disasters in the United Kingdom
February 1949 events in the United Kingdom
Airliner accidents and incidents in the United Kingdom